Depleted of most of their stars due to World War I, the Chicago White Sox had a relatively bad year in 1918, going 57–67 and finishing in the second division. They had won the American League pennant in 1917 and would win another in 1919.

Regular season 
Ace pitcher Eddie Cicotte led the AL in losses, with 19.

Season standings

Record vs. opponents

Roster

Player stats

Batting

Starters by position 
Note: Pos = Position; G = Games played; AB = At bats; H = Hits; Avg. = Batting average; HR = Home runs; RBI = Runs batted in

Other batters 
Note: G = Games played; AB = At bats; H = Hits; Avg. = Batting average; HR = Home runs; RBI = Runs batted in

Pitching

Starting pitchers 
Note: G = Games pitched; IP = Innings pitched; W = Wins; L = Losses; ERA = Earned run average; SO = Strikeouts

Other pitchers 
Note: G = Games pitched; IP = Innings pitched; W = Wins; L = Losses; ERA = Earned run average; SO = Strikeouts

Relief pitchers 
Note: G = Games pitched; W = Wins; L = Losses; SV = Saves; ERA = Earned run average; SO = Strikeouts

Awards and honors

League top ten finishers 
Eddie Cicotte
 #6 in AL in strikeouts (104)

Eddie Murphy
 #9 in AL in batting average (.297)

Buck Weaver
 #7 in AL in batting average (.300)

External links
1918 Chicago White Sox at Baseball Reference

Chicago White Sox seasons
Chicago White Sox season
Chicago White